Join My Pretty World is the debut studio album by Geko, released on November 17, 1992 by Open Records.

Reception 

Ned Raggett of AllMusic says "Join My Pretty World finds the sharply powerful duo creating rough, industrial-strength darkwave music that easily bears repeated listening" and "is an underrated effort well worth seeking out."

Track listing

Personnel 
Adapted from the Join My Pretty World liner notes.

Geko
 Sarah Folkman – lead vocals, bass guitar, drum programming, musical arrangements
 Carrie McNinch – guitar, drum programming, musical arrangements

Production
 Earle Mankey – production

Release history

References

External links 
 Join My Pretty World at iTunes
 Join My Pretty World at Discogs (list of releases)

1992 debut albums
Albums produced by Earle Mankey